Lophopyxis is a genus of flowering plants and the sole genus of the family Lophopyxidaceae. The group consists of 2 species of tendrillate lianas. They are found in the Sunda Islands.

References

Malpighiales genera
Malpighiales
Taxa named by William Jackson Hooker